Nanivitrea is a genus of small freshwater snails that have an operculum, aquatic gastropod mollusks in the family Hydrobiidae.

Species 
Species within the genus Nanivitrea include:
 Nanivitrea alcaldei 
 Nanivitrea helicoides (Gundlach, 1865)

References 

Hydrobiidae